Neptuno may refer to a number of ships named for Neptune, the god of freshwater and the sea in Roman mythology.

Spanish ship Neptuno, a number of ships of the Spanish Navy 
 (1944), a Portuguese submarine, formerly HMS Spearhead
Neptuno (2015), a semi-submersible accommodation vessel

See also
 Neptun (ship)
 Neptune (ship)

References

Ship names